Eupithecia truncatipennis is a moth in the family Geometridae. It is found in Brazil.

References

Moths described in 1897
truncatipennis
Moths of South America